Numa Numa is a mission on Bougainville Island, Papua New Guinea. It has a nearby harbour known as the Numa Numa Harbour on the eastern coast of Bougainville Island on the Pacific Ocean and is located near Wakunai, Teperoi and Casuarina Island. Nearby is the Wakunai Airport.

Numa Numa borders the Numa Numa Trail, that starts running from Numa Numa on the east coast over the central mountains of Bougainville to Torokina on the western coast. The trail was central to the Torokina perimeter defence during the initial phases of the Bougainville campaign during World War II with a number of battles fought along the trail.

References

Autonomous Region of Bougainville